"The Angel and the Gambler" is a single from the Iron Maiden album Virtual XI, released in 1998. It preceded the release of Virtual XI by two weeks.

Synopsis
It is the first Iron Maiden single to feature a video as a B-side. It is also the first Iron Maiden single to use the band's alternate logo with the extended ends of the "R", "M", and both "N's" removed. This variant would be used on all future singles until 2010's "El Dorado". The singles includes two audio tracks recorded live at Kåren, Gothenburg, Sweden in 1995 on The X Factour, their tour in support of The X Factor.

At 9 minutes and 56 seconds in length, it was the band's longest single at the time and the only one to exceed the 8-minute mark, until it was surpassed by the 18-minute "Empire of the Clouds", released 18 years later as the second single from their 2015 album The Book of Souls.

To support the single with more airplay, the band also released a music video, which featured the shortened version of the song. In an almost Star Wars fashion, the video features an entirely computer-generated world filled with aliens of varying quality. The concept for the video, particularly Blaze walking into the bar with a brown hat and a long jacket were taken from concept art designed for the Somewhere in Time album, specifically the single "Stranger in a Strange Land".

The single was released in four parts: CD part 1 contains a poster, with the "Virtual XI Fixture List 1998" on one side and the band posing in Maiden football gear with some of their favourite players on the other side. CD part 2 contains three double-sided cards with the musicians posing in Maiden football gear and also has a shortened version of "The Angel and the Gambler". The third was a 7" picture disc and the fourth was a CD maxi-single with both b-side live tracks on it. The picture disc and maxi-single both had the edited version of the title track.

B-sides
The 7" picture disc had "Blood On The Worlds Hands" live; cd 1 had "Blood On The Worlds Hands" also and "Afraid to Shoot Strangers" video; cd 2 had "The Aftermath" live and "Man on the Edge" video; the maxi-single had both live b-sides but only "Afraid to Shoot Strangers" video for some reason.

Track listing

7" picture disc

 "The Angel and the Gambler" (edited version) (Steve Harris) - 6:05
 "Blood on the World's Hands (live - Kåren, Gothenburg, Sweden 1 November 1995)" (Harris) - 6:07

CD part 1

 "The Angel and the Gambler" (full album version) (Harris) – 9:56
 "Blood on the World's Hands" (live - Kåren, Gothenburg, Sweden 1 November 1995) (Harris) - 6:05
 "Afraid to Shoot Strangers" (live video) (Harris)

CD part 2

 "The Angel and the Gambler" (edited version) (Harris) – 6:05
 "The Aftermath" (live - Kåren, Gothenburg, Sweden 1 November 1995) (Harris, Blaze Bayley, Janick Gers) – 6:45
 "Man on the Edge" (live video) (Bayley, Gers) – 4:12

CD Maxi-Single

 "The Angel and the Gambler" (edited version) (Harris) – 6:05
 "Blood on the World's Hands" (live - Kåren, Gothenburg, Sweden 1 November 1995) (Harris) - 6:05
 "The Aftermath" (live - Kåren, Gothenburg, Sweden 1 November 1995) (Harris, Bayley, Gers) – 6:45
 "Afraid to Shoot Strangers" (live video) (Harris)

Personnel
Production credits are adapted from the CD Single cover.
Iron Maiden
Blaze Bayley – lead vocals
Dave Murray – guitar
Janick Gers – guitar
Steve Harris – bass guitar, keyboards, producer, mixing
Nicko McBrain – drums
Production
Nigel Green – mixing ("The Angel and the Gambler")
Synthetic Dimensions – sleeve illustration
Hugh Gilmour – layout

Charts

References

Iron Maiden songs
1998 singles
Songs written by Steve Harris (musician)
EMI Records singles
1998 songs